John "Peanuts" Tronolone (December 12, 1910 − May 29, 1991) was a Cleveland, Ohio mobster who succeeded crime boss James Licavoli as head of the Cleveland crime family. Tronolone ran the Cleveland family following the Licavoli-Nardi gang wars from 1985 until 1991.

Born in Buffalo, New York, Tronolone was arrested three times before the age of 21. He allegedly gained his nickname "Peanuts" by giving candy to neighborhood children visiting his father's candy store. During the 1930s, he was a close associate of Buffalo mobster Joe DiCarlo. Sometime in the 1940s, he moved to Cleveland where he became an active member of the Cleveland crime family. In 1975, he was convicted of operating a bookmaking operation with an estimated weekly income exceeding $1 million; Tronolone was sentenced to two years imprisonment with a $2,000 fine. Tronolone maintained his family responsibilities from his residence in Florida, where he also operated a travel agency.

Tronolone frequently served as facilitator between the Cleveland family and the Mafia Commission in New York.  Since Cleveland was not a Commission member, their interests were served by front boss Anthony Salerno from the Genovese crime family.  Tronolone also helped Salerno with other important jobs.  In 1980, Angelo Bruno, the boss of the Philadelphia crime family, was killed by rivals within his crime family.  The Commission, upset with Bruno's unsanctioned murder, issued a death edict for Philadelphia gangster Johnny "Keys" Simone.  Aware that he was in trouble, Simone traveled to Florida to ask Tronolone to intercede for him with Salerno. Tronolone called Salerno, who told him that Simone's fate was sealed.  At Salerno's request, Tronolone assured Simone that everything was now OK and that he should return to New York and talk to Salerno. The reassured Simone returned to New York, where his body was discovered several days later.
 
In 1981, Tronolone and 14 other mobsters were indicted on federal racketeering charges, including 29 counts of conspiracy to murder, labor racketeering, illegal gambling, bid rigging for local food and construction industries, and conspiracy to defraud the Teamsters Union through election fraud. In October 1983, acting boss Angelo Lonardo became a protected federal witness against Tronolone and other Cleveland family members.  Trenbolone then became acting boss.  In 1985, after Tronolone's acquittal on racketeering charges and the death of Licavoli, Trenbolone became the permanent boss of the weakened Cleveland family.

In 1989, Tronolone became the only Mafia boss to have the distinction of being arrested in a hand-to-hand undercover transaction by local law enforcement. He accepted allegedly stolen jewelry from Lt. Dave Green, an undercover Broward County deputy in exchange for bookmaking and loan sharking debts. Green was forced to wear a disguise because Tronolone knew his real identity.

On May 29, 1991, Tronolone died before he could start his nine-year state prison sentence. A funeral mass was held for him at St. Joseph Catholic Church in Miami Beach.

References

Raab, Selwyn. Five Families: The Rise, Decline, and Resurgence of America's Most Powerful Mafia Empires. New York: St. Martin Press, 2005.

Further reading
Capeci, Jerry. The Complete Idiot's Guide to the Mafia. Indianapolis: Alpha Books, 2002. 
Neff, James. Mobbed Up: Jackie Presser's High-Wire Life in the Teamsters, the Mafia, and the FBI. New York: Atlantic Monthly Press, 1989. 
Porrello, Rick. To Kill the Irishman: The War That Crippled the Mafia. Novelty, Ohio: Next Hat Press, 2004. 
Smith, John L. Running Scared: the life and treacherous times of Las Vegas casino king Steve Wynn. New York: Four Walls Eight Windows, 2001. 
United States. Congress. Senate. Committee on Governmental Affairs. Permanent Subcommittee on Investigations. Organized Criminal Activities: south Florida and U.S. Penitentiary, Atlanta, Ga. 1980. 
United States. Congress. Senate. Committee on Governmental Affairs. Permanent Subcommittee on Investigations. Organized Crime: 25 Years After Valachi: Hearings Before the Permanent Subcommittee on Investigations. 1988. 
United States. Congress. House. Committee on the Judiciary. Subcommittee on Criminal Justice. Oversight Hearing on Organized Crime Strike Forces: Hearing Before the Subcommittee on Criminal Justice. 1989. 
United States. Congress. Senate. Committee on Governmental Affairs. Permanent Subcommittee on Investigations. Federal Government's Use of Trusteeships Under the RICO Statute: Hearings Before the Permanent Subcommittee on Investigations. 1989. 
United States. Congress. Senate. Impeachment Trial Committee on the Articles against Judge Alcee L. Hastings. Report of the Senate Impeachment Trial Committee on the Articles Against Judge Walter L. Nixon. 1989.

External links
The New Criminologist: John Tronolone
 The Nevada Observer April 9 2006 STATEMENT OF ANGELO LONARDO BEFORE THE U.S. SENATE PERMANENT SUBCOMMITTEE ON INVESTIGATIONS HEARINGS ON ORGANIZED CRIME: 25 YEARS AFTER VALACHI

 

1910 births
1991 deaths
American gangsters of Italian descent
Cleveland crime family